Food Banks Canada (formerly the Canadian Association of Food Banks) is a charitable organization representing the food bank community across Canada. Founded in 1987, Food Banks Canada’s network is made up of 10 Provincial Associations and over 500 local food banks. The organization’s mission is to "enable an effective food bank community that addresses the short term need for food and longer term solutions to reduce hunger in Canada".  It operates a number of programs such as the Hunger Awareness Week, HungerCount, a research report on food bank use in Canada, and a Safe Food Handling program for food banks.

In 2008, the Canadian Association of Food Banks changed its name to "Food Banks Canada".

History
The first food bank in Canada opened its doors in 1981 in the city of Edmonton, Alberta. In 1987, the Canadian food bank community created the Canadian Association of Food Banks to represent food banks nationally.

There are now over 700 food banks and 3,000 food programs available in Canada.

In 2008, HungerCount reported that on average, 704,414 individuals used a food bank per month. Other HungerCount 2008 numbers include:

37% of those assisted are children under the age of 18
50% of assisted households have at least one child
For 20% of assisted households, primary source of income is current or recent employment
Approximately 13% are receiving provincial disability income support
50% are receiving social assistance
In March 2008, food banks served 3,091,777 meals in 4324234
In March 2008, volunteers gave 440,000 hours of their time to assist food banks

Activities
Some of Food Banks Canada's activities include food distribution through the National Food Sharing System, the annual HungerCount research report on national and provincial food bank use in Canada, and Hunger Awareness Week to promote the work of food banks and the individuals using their services.

Murray the Brave
In May 2020 during the COVID-19 pandemic in Canada it partnered with Cheerios to do a tribute to food bank workers in a thirty-second commercial.

Members
Food Banks Canada’s membership includes 10 Provincial Associations and over 500 local food banks. The 10 Provincial Associations are:
Food Banks British Columbia
Food Banks Alberta 
Food Banks of Saskatchewan Corporation
Manitoba Association of Food Banks
Ontario Association of Food Banks (OAFB)
Banques Alimentaires Québec
New Brunswick Association of Food Banks (NBAFB)
FEED NOVA SCOTIA
P.E.I. Association of Food Banks
Community Food Sharing Association of Newfoundland & Labrador

See also

 List of food banks

References

External links
 Food Banks Canada
 Food Banks Alberta
 Ontario Association of Food Banks 
 Banques Alimentaires Québec
 FEED NOVA SCOTIA
 Community Food Sharing Association
 Food Banks of Saskatchewan

Organizations established in 1987
Charities based in Canada
Food banks in Canada